Maeng Seong-ung (born 4 February 1998) is a South Korean footballer currently playing as a midfielder for Jeonbuk Hyundai Motors.

Career statistics

Club

Notes

Honours

International
South Korea U23
AFC U-23 Championship: 2020

References

External links
 

1998 births
Living people
South Korean footballers
South Korea youth international footballers
Association football midfielders
K League 1 players
K League 2 players
FC Anyang players
Jeonbuk Hyundai Motors players